Valence is a commune in the Charente department in southwestern France. It was not the birthplace of William de Valence, who later became Earl of Pembroke.

Population

See also
Communes of the Charente department

References

Communes of Charente